Jeltje Haanstra (born 1932 or 1933) was a Dutch kortebaan speed skater from Katlijk.

As a girl she became champion of Friesland in 1948.

She won many competitions between 1948 and 1954. In the winter of 1950–51 she had a muscle injury and couldn’t compete at several competitions. In January 1953 she couldn’t finish a competition due to a leg injury.

Haanstra studied at U.L.O.

References

Dutch female speed skaters
Year of death missing
Place of death missing
Year of birth uncertain
Date of birth missing
Place of birth missing
Sportspeople from Friesland
1930s births
20th-century Dutch women